Linda Avey (née Bahnson) is an American biologist and entrepreneur. She is known for co-founding 23andMe, a consumer genetic data company.

Early life 

Avey was born in 1960, in South Dakota, United States. She attended Augustana University, where she received a Bachelor of Arts in biology in 1982.

Early career 
Avey began her scientific career in 1982 at University of California, Irvine as a staff research associate. In 1985 she moved into various sales and business development in the fields of biopharmaceutical and academic research based in San Francisco, Boston, San Diego, and Washington, DC. She worked for Perlegen Sciences (2003-2005), coordinating the world's first genome-wide association studies, and for Affymetrix on the translational medicine team (2005-2006) with the goal of identifying genetic markers for diagnostic tests She also held positions at Spotfire, Chemdex, Applied Biosystems, PerSeptive Biosystems, Molecular Dynamics, and Waters Corporation.

23andMe and later career 

In March 2006 Avey, Anne Wojcicki, and Paul Cusenza founded 23andMe,  the world's first  consumer genetic data company. Avey left the company in 2009. Cusenza had left the company in 2007.

In 2009, Avey launched the Brainstorm Research Foundation, focused on accelerating research on the prevention and alleviation of Alzheimer's disease.

In 2011, Avey co-founded Curious, Inc. with Heather Anne Halpert and Mitsu Hadeishi. The company was focused on building an online data aggregator of sensors, wearables, trackers, apps, social media, biometrics, and other personal data.
In 2018 Avey and Aneil Mallavarapu, PhD, focused on building automation tools for the Indian clinical market through their start-up Precisely, Inc.

Avey is an advisor to Verily Life Sciences and is on the Board of Fellows at Stanford Medical School.

References

21st-century American biologists
American women company founders
Living people
1960 births
American technology company founders
American women biologists
Augustana University alumni
Businesspeople from South Dakota
Scientists from South Dakota
21st-century American women scientists